Babiana bainesii is a species of geophyte of  high that is assigned to the family Iridaceae. It sometimes grows in tufts. The approximately upright leaf blades appear directly from the ground, are narrow, sword- to line-shaped and have a left and right surface, rather than an upper and lower surface, and far exceed the flowers in length. The leaf blades are pleated. The inflorescence stem is fully underground and often branched. It contains two to eight blue, violet or mauve mirror-symmetrical flowers comprising six tepals. The lower lateral tepals are adorned with white markings that contrast strongly against the background colour. The three stamens are crowding under the dorsal tepal. Flowering occurs between February and May. The flowers are often sweetly scented. B. bainesii has a wide distribution and occurs in Botswana, Namibia, South Africa, southernmost Zambia and Zimbabwe.

Description 
The leaf blades appear directly from the ground and reach much higher than the flowers. The leaf blades are not coiled, and their tips are pointy and do not end in several irregular teeth. 

The inner bract is forked only at the tip, which is different from many other species that have more deeply forked inner bracts or inner bracts that are split entirely to the base. The inflorescence consists of two to eight blue, violet or mauve mirror-symmetrical flowers born below ground level. The lower lateral tepals are adorned with white blotches that contrast strongly against the background colour. The three stamens are crowding under the dorsal tepal. Flowering occurs between February and May. The flowers are often sweetly scented. The ovary is hairless and sits on a very short stalk in the lower flowers.

Differences with similar species 
Babiana hypogaea also has its entire stems underground, but this species has pale buff or yellow flowers that occur from June to September. B. bainesii has blue, violet or mauve flowers from Februari till April or sometimes May.

Taxonomy 
Babiana bainesii was first described for science by John Gilbert Baker in 1876, based on specimens collected by Thomas Baines at Witwatersrand near Johannesburg, in Gauteng, South Africa. In 1904, Baker described a collection by Rudolf Schlechter as B. schlechteri. In 1959, Gwendoline Joyce Lewis described B. hypogea, but this collection is different from B. hypogaea that was described by Baker. She also distinguished B. hypogaea var. longituba and B. hypogaea var. ensifolia. Peter Goldblatt and John Charles Manning regard all these names as synonyms of Babiana bainesii.

Distribution, ecology and conservation 
Babiana bainesii has a large distribution that covers the summer rainfall areas of south Africa, from the Great Karoo on the border of the Western Cape and Norther Cape provinces, through North West, Gauteng, Mpumalanga, Limpopo, on to Botswana, Zimbabwe and southernmost Zambia, and in Namibia. It grows in bushland and dry grassland on sandy and stony flats and slopes. It is considered a least concern species.

References

External links 
photos on Waterberg bioquest

bainsii
Flora of Southern Africa
Plants described in 1876
Taxa named by John Gilbert Baker